Don't Lean Out the Window, is a 1977 Yugoslav drama film directed by Bogdan Žižić.

The film won two Golden Arena awards at the 1977 Pula Film Festival, for Best Film and for Best Supporting Actress (Mira Banjac).

Plot
Filip, a young man from the Dalmatian hinterland, goes to Frankfurt looking for a job. He is enticed by the example of his compatriot Mate, who Filip believes made a fortune working in Germany. Upon his arrival in Frankfurt, he is unable to get in touch with Mate, so he takes a black market construction job working under Čikeš, a corrupt boss. He gets injured in a work accident, and experiences a series of discouraging setbacks. While his spirits are lifted by a romantic relationship with Verica, a saleswoman in a record store, over time he realizes he has no reason to stay...

References

External links

Ne naginji se kroz prozor 

1977 films
1977 drama films
Serbo-Croatian-language films
Jadran Film films
Films directed by Bogdan Žižić
Films set in Frankfurt
Yugoslav drama films
Croatian drama films